Wolfson College may refer to:

Wolfson College, Cambridge
Wolfson College, Oxford